The TCU–Texas A&M football rivalry is an American college football rivalry between the TCU Horned Frogs and Texas A&M Aggies. After 72 consecutive meetings as members of the Southwest Conference (SWC) from 1924 to 1995, the series has yet to be scheduled in the regular season as a non-conference game since the SWC disbanded in 1996. In the most recent game between the two programs, the Aggies defeated the Horned Frogs 28–9 at the 2001 Galleryfurniture.com Bowl in Houston, Texas.

History
TCU and Texas A&M played 19 times before they were both in the Southwest Conference that was made up of Arkansas, Oklahoma, and Texas universities. Until the early 1990s the conference started to fall apart when the University of Arkansas announced that they will move to the Southeastern Conference. In 1994, Texas A&M announced with other Texas schools, that they will join the Big Eight Conference to form the Big 12 Conference. TCU did not receive an invitation to join with Texas A&M, and so TCU moved to the Western Athletic Conference in 1996, Conference USA in 2001, and then the Mountain West Conference in 2005. In 2012, TCU finally got the chance to move to the Big 12 Conference with its other Texas rivals except for one, Texas A&M. Texas A&M moved to the Southeastern Conference in 2012. The future of the rivalry is uncertain. 
 
Over the life of the series, the Aggies have shutout the Horned Frogs 21 times, and been shutout 9 times (including scoreless ties in 1909 and 1927). The Aggies hold the largest margin of victory with a 74–10 win in College Station on November 22, 1986 (the Aggies also hold the next ten-largest margins of victory, with each ranging from 34 to 56 points). The Aggies' current winning streak of 24 games from 1973 to 1995 and including the 2001 Galleryfurniture.com Bowl is the longest in the series.

At a yell practice before the 1930 TCU game, A&M Board of Regents member Pinky Downs '06 shouted, "What are we going to do to those Horned Frogs?" His muse did not fail him as he improvised, borrowing a term from frog hunting. "Gig 'em, Aggies!" he said as he made a fist with his thumb extended straight up. The phrase stuck, and with that the first hand sign in the Southwest Conference came into being.

Game results

See also  
 List of NCAA college football rivalry games

References

College football rivalries in the United States
TCU Horned Frogs football
Texas A&M Aggies football
1897 establishments in Texas